Patrick Cubaynes (born 6 May 1960 in Nîmes) is a French former professional footballer who played as a striker.

International career
Cubaynes was a member of the French squad that won the gold medal at the 1984 Summer Olympics in Los Angeles, California.

Personal life
In January 2017, at the age of 56 he played for the reserve team of US Saint-Didier.

References

External links
 Profile at racingstub.com

1960 births
Living people
Association football midfielders
French footballers
Footballers from Nîmes
Nîmes Olympique players
SC Bastia players
RC Strasbourg Alsace players
Olympique de Marseille players
Montpellier HSC players
AC Avignonnais players
Pau FC players
Ligue 1 players
Footballers at the 1984 Summer Olympics
Olympic footballers of France
Olympic gold medalists for France
Olympic medalists in football
Medalists at the 1984 Summer Olympics